Teagle may refer to:
Terry Michael Teagle (born 1960), American professional basketball player
Walter Clark Teagle (1878–1962), American president of Standard Oil of New Jersey 
Teagle, California
Block and tackle